Geoff or Jeff McDonald may refer to:

Geoff McDonald, musician with Miracles of Modern Science
Geoff McDonald, see Christian politics in New Zealand
Jeff McDonald, musician

See also
Jeff MacDonald (disambiguation)